Your Witness is an American dramatized court show that aired on the ABC network from September 19, 1949, to September 26, 1950. The 30-minute program first aired on Mondays at 8 P.M. EST, then moved to Sundays at 9 P.M., and ended up on Wednesdays at 9 P.M.  It was based around real-life cases.

Edmund Lowe starred in the program, which originated in Chicago from WENR.

Your Witness was nominated for an Emmy Award for Best Live Show in 1950.

References

External links
 

1949 American television series debuts
1950 American television series endings
1940s American drama television series
1950s American drama television series
American Broadcasting Company original programming
Black-and-white American television shows
English-language television shows
American crime television series
Dramatized court shows